National Cooperative Growth Study (NCGS) is the largest observational database in the U.S. of children with growth disorders. Started in 1985, NCGS was a long term longitudinal study following patients undergoing growth hormone treatment in North America (the U.S. and Canada). The study was closed in 2010.  At that time it had over 200,000 patient-years of statistical data collected.  The related iNCGS (the "i" standing for "International") database is ongoing in Europe, collecting data in the United Kingdom, France, Germany, Italy, Spain and other European Union member countries.

Sources

Growth hormones